Blackline or black line may refer to:

 Blackline (GPS company), best known for a car-tracking device that uses Global Positioning (GPS)
 Northern Tube Line, a line on the London Underground
 Blackline (software company), whose software offerings are Cloud-based accounting software
 Black Lines, a 2015 album by American rock band Mayday Parade
 Document comparison or blacklining, a computer process to identify changes in a document
 Linea nigra (black line), pigmentation on the abdomen, most often during pregnancy
 Black Line, a cycling team in the British National Team Sprint Championships
 Black Line, an 1830 offensive during the Black War between British colonists and Aboriginal Australians in Tasmania

See also
 Blackline rasbora (Rasbora borapetensis), a fish found in Asia